Tech Field was a baseball stadium, located in San Antonio, Texas, from 1921 until 1946. It served as the home of the San Antonio Missions of the Texas League. It also served as the spring training site of the Pittsburgh Pirates in 1936 and the St. Louis Browns from 1937–1941. The field belonged to Fox Tech High School.

The Missions team moved to Tech Field after a June 18, 1932, fire destroyed the club's former home at League Park. The Missions then were affiliated with the St. Louis Browns, which had made some moves in the late 1930s toward buying the property. The Browns front office passed when offered the opportunity again, months before the city school district decided to sell it to the San Antonio Transit Company, forerunner of VIA Metropolitan Transit, for $160,000. Alamo Stadium, then opened in 1940 and become the chief venue for high school football. Tech Field was deem non-essential to the school district. The Missions were allowed to play there for a final season in 1946, before the field was demolished.

References

Minor league baseball venues
Baseball venues in San Antonio
Baseball venues in Texas
St. Louis Browns spring training venues
Pittsburgh Pirates spring training venues
Defunct baseball venues in the United States
Defunct minor league baseball venues
Sports venues demolished in 1946
Sports venues completed in 1921
1921 establishments in Texas
1946 disestablishments in Texas
High school baseball venues in the United States